is a series of hack-and-slash action video games created by Sega. The ninja (shinobi) Joe Musashi is the protagonist of the original series of games (Shinobi to Shinobi III).

The first Shinobi game was released in 1987 for arcades. Along with Alex Kidd and Sonic the Hedgehog, Joe Musashi has long been one of Sega's flagship characters, acting as a mascot for a short time in the late 1980s when ninjas were popular in mainstream media. The series' games are a showcase of Sega's technical accomplishment, noted for their high quality of graphics, gameplay and music, as well as their high level of difficulty. The Shinobi franchise sold more than 4.60 million copies.

Plot
The main character of Shinobi (the original Japanese word for "ninja") is most commonly associated with that of Joe Musashi, the protagonist of the original arcade game and many of its sequels. His name is a combination of both an archetypical Western first name and Japanese last name, Musashi likely being derived from the legendary Japanese swordsman Miyamoto Musashi. In the manual of The Revenge of Shinobi, Musashi's backstory is told as that of a weak boy who first entered the dojo of the Oboro clan at a young age and gradually, through tireless practice and meditation, worked himself up to become the most skilled and respected ninja of his clan. His peaceful existence in the mountains of Japan is shattered when the ninja crime syndicate Zeed rises to power and attempts to revert Japan into the Sengoku period of civil war when the ninja thrived.

After being defeated by Musashi in the original Shinobi, Zeed reforms three years later as Neo Zeed and attacks the Oboro clan directly. With his master assassinated and his girlfriend Naoko kidnapped by the enemy, Musashi swears revenge, and in the ensuing battles through a series of locations in Japan and America, as chronicled in The Revenge of Shinobi, all but annihilates Neo Zeed. When Neo Zeed returns in Shinobi III: Return of the Ninja Master, Musashi comes out of retirement one last time and destroys them for good.

In the arcade version of Shadow Dancer, Joe Musashi is replaced by a nameless new ninja and his canine companion as the game's protagonists. The ninja and his dog must disarm various time bombs spread across an unnamed metropolis that were planted by a terrorist group. The game was remade for the Mega Drive/Genesis under the title Shadow Dancer: The Secret of Shinobi, with the protagonist's identity differing between regions. The Japanese version identifies him as Joe Musashi's estranged son , while the English language manual identifies him as Joe Musashi himself coming out of retirement. In the Master System game The Cyber Shinobi, Zeed has resurfaced once more, this time under the name of Cyber Zeed. A grandson of Joe Musashi must prevent them from threatening the world again.

Shinobi Legions presents an different plotline. The shinobi is Sho, the youngest of two brothers raised by a lone ninja master. The elder brother becomes corrupted and abducts the master's daughter in search of the ultimate ninjitsu technique, and Sho has to prevent him from destroying the world. Neither Joe Musashi nor the Oboro clan are mentioned.

Following a seven-year hiatus in the series, the lead archetype returns in Shinobi for PlayStation 2 as Hotsuma, another member of the Oboro clan. In a similar theme to Shinobi Legions, the game starts with Hotsuma slaying his elder brother Moritsune during a full moon Oboro ritual. The main plot revolves around Hotsuma's battle to defeat a powerful sorcerer called Hiruko and put an end to anarchy in Tokyo. The game features Joe Musashi as a hidden character, as well as Moritsune himself (who appears in the game's storyline as an enemy named Aomizuchi).

In a break with tradition, Nightshade (Kunoichi in Japan) featured a female ninja named Hibana. Hotsuma appears as a hidden character, though it requires a completed Shinobi PS2 game save on the memory card to unlock him. Joe Musashi returns as he did in the PS2 Shinobi by completing 88 missions in the game. The protagonist of the 3DS Shinobi 3D is Jiro Musashi, Joe's father.

Gameplay
The main weapons of Shinobi are the shuriken (or throwing knives), but over the course of the series the emphasis gradually shifted to a ninjato. One of the most important moves in the games is Shinobi's somersault, performed by tapping the jump-button a second time at the height of a jump. The somersault is used to leap onto high-places, perform trick jumps and use the hedgehog shuriken attack to wipe out several opponents at once. The ability to run was introduced in Shinobi III.

Another staple of the series are the four magical ninjitsu attacks Shinobi can use to kill their foes, or improve their own abilities. The four ninjitsu techniques are: Ikazuchi, Fushin, Kariu and Mijin. Another common feature of the early Shinobi games is the enemy AI, where enemies could duck behind boxes to reload their weapons after firing at Musashi, or hide behind boxes or shields to block Musashi's shurikens.

Each level in Shinobi is usually divided into two or three scenes, and the final scene is a battle against a powerful boss character. Standard Shinobi stages include bamboo forests, dojos, docksides, and industrial complexes filled with biological monstrosities.

Timeline
The following is a timeline of releases in the Shinobi series. Listed are the name of each game, the corresponding release date and the consoles for which they were developed/ported. Further below is a brief discussion of each release. For a more detailed examination of each game, click on the corresponding link in the timetable.

Notes
A^ Unavailable in PAL regions.
B^ Released as Shinobi X in PAL regions.

Series

Shinobi (1987)

Shinobi, the first game in the series, was released in 1987 for the arcades and ran on Sega's System 16 arcade hardware. Sega released a home conversion for the Master System, followed by licensed ports for the IBM PC, Amiga, Atari ST, Commodore 64, Amstrad CPC, ZX Spectrum and MSX, as well as the PC Engine (via Asmik) in Japan, and an unlicensed port by Tengen for the Nintendo Entertainment System in North America. Shinobi introduced several novelties to traditional platform mechanics, such as sophisticated enemy AI and multiple layers in each level.

Shadow Dancer (1989)

Shadow Dancer is the 1989 arcade sequel to the original Shinobi. It runs on Sega's System 18 arcade hardware. The plot follows an unnamed ninja and his canine companion who must disarm various bombs spread across a city and defeat the terrorist group responsible for planting them.

The Revenge of Shinobi (1989)

In Japan it is known as The Super Shinobi. The debut of the ninja on the Mega Drive console, The Revenge of Shinobi was widely praised at the time of its release and long one of the most popular games on the Mega Drive and is regarded as the best entry in the series by many. Its soundtrack was written by composer Yuzo Koshiro.

Shadow Dancer: The Secret of Shinobi (1990)

The Mega Drive version of Shadow Dancer, titled Shadow Dancer: The Secret of Shinobi and is different game from the arcade original. The backstory differs between regional releases, giving the unnamed protagonist from the arcade version an identity - the Japanese version establishes him as Hayate, the estranged son of Joe Musashi; while the manuals for the English language versions claims that he is Joe Musashi himself. Although the basic gameplay is similar to the arcade version, little of the actual game content — from levels to character art — is the same.

The Cyber Shinobi (1990)

The Cyber Shinobi was a Master System exclusive title, released as a follow-up to the Master System port of the original Shinobi. The Cyber Shinobi is notorious for being one of the worst games in the series. Since it is mentioned in the manual that the hero's grandfather defeated Neo Zeed, the Joe Musashi-character in this game appears to be the grandson of the original Joe Musashi.

The G.G. Shinobi (1991)

The debut of Shinobi on the Game Gear system was titled Shinobi, though in Japan it was known as The GG Shinobi (The Game Gear Shinobi) and the game still carries this name internally in all regions. Its gameplay is largely reminiscent of The Revenge of Shinobi. In a take on the Japanese Super Sentai series, Shinobi revolves around the quest of five coloured ninjas (red, pink, blue, yellow and green) to bring down a powerful crime organization. The game starts with the player just controlling the red ninja and then freeing more and more of his compatriots as he progresses through each level. The soundtrack was once again composed by Yuzo Koshiro.

The G.G. Shinobi II: The Silent Fury (1992)

The Silent Fury (also The G.G. Shinobi II) is a direct sequel to the original The G.G. Shinobi game on Game Gear, and features much of the same gameplay mechanics as its predecessor. Both The G.G. Shinobi and The Silent Fury were Game Gear exclusive games. It was scored by Yuzo Koshiro and Motohiro Kawashima.

Shinobi III: Return of the Ninja Master (1993)

Known as The Super Shinobi II in Japan, Shinobi III is regarded by many as the high point of the series. It introduced a much smoother, faster style of gameplay while keeping the series' familiar trademarks firmly intact. The game marked Musashi's last appearance in a Shinobi game until Shinobi was released in 2002 for the PlayStation 2. At least two known beta versions of Shinobi III are currently in circulation, featuring almost completely different levels from the final game.

Shinobi Legions (1995)

Shinobi Legions was the only Shinobi game developed for Sega Saturn, and the last sidescrolling title in the series until The Revenge of Shinobi on the Game Boy Advance. The gameplay is similar to that of Shinobi III but with many tweaks. The plot represented a break with the traditional storyline of the previous games, as it focuses on an entirely new character named Sho. Shinobi Legions uses live-action cutsequences between each round and digitized live actors in game sequences.

Shinobi (2002)

Shinobi debuted in the world of 3D gaming with Shinobi, only for PlayStation 2. It is the third game in the series to simply be called Shinobi. The story introduces a new member of Oboro clan called Hotsuma. Shinobis gameplay is based upon a combo system called the tate-system, which produces a very fast and smooth style of play. However, even more so than other Shinobi titles, Shinobi is also noted for its extreme difficulty. Whenever Hotsuma dies, the player has to start the level all over again. Although this reboot of the franchise was generally well received by critics and fans alike, some of the bigger complaints waged against the game were for its average graphics, somewhat repetitive gameplay, and (as noted earlier) steep difficulty. Joe Musashi can be unlocked as a playable character after finishing the game.

Nightshade (2003)

The first game of the Shinobi series to feature a female lead, Nightshade is a continuation of 2002's Shinobi with differences to the gameplay. In Japan, the game is known as Kunoichi, the Japanese term to denote the female equivalent of Shinobi.

Shinobi 3D (2011)

Shinobi 3D was developed by Griptonite Games for the Nintendo 3DS. The game returned to the side-scrolling nature of earlier games and was released in November 2011. It is the twelfth title in the series since the 1987 original arcade games.

Spin-off games
In 1990, Sega released Alex Kidd in Shinobi World on Master System, a spoof of the original Shinobi game in which Alex Kidd takes the position of Joe Musashi. In the game, Alex Kidd has to rescue his girlfriend, a native of Shinobi World, from an evil ninja named Hanzo. A good ninja fuses into him and gives him his powers. Often related to the series is the handheld The Revenge of Shinobi game for Game Boy Advance, however, this game shares only the name and basic premise (ninja action) with other Shinobi titles.

In other media
In 2014, Sega and Hakuhodo DY formed the production company Stories International for feature film and TV projects based on their Shinobi games. In April 2016, Marc Platt was assigned to produce a live action Shinobi movie through his production banner Marc Platt Productions along with Adam Siegel & Stories President and CEO, Tomoya Suzuki.

See also
List of ninja video games

References

External links
Hardcore Gaming 101: The Shinobi Series
Shinobi series at MobyGames

 
Sega Games franchises
Video games about ninja
Video game franchises introduced in 1987
Hack and slash video games by series